Chamonate Airport ,  is an airport serving Copiapó, the capital of the Atacama Region of Chile. It served as the main airport for the region until February 2005 when Desierto de Atacama Airport opened.

There is rising terrain in all quadrants.

See also

Transport in Chile
List of airports in Chile

References

External links
OurAirports - Chamonate
SkyVector - Chamonate
FallingRain - Chamonate Airport

Airports in Atacama Region